The 1981 Austin Kangaroos football team was an American football team represented Austin College as a member of the Texas Intercollegiate Athletic Association (TIAA) during the 1981 NAIA Division II football season. In their ninth season under head coach Larry Kramer, the Kangaroos compiled an 11–1–1 record (9–1 against TIAA opponents), and tied for the TIAA championship. After losing their second game, the Kangaroos won 10 straight games.

The team played its home games at Louis Calder Stadium in Sherman, Texas.

Individual honors

The team was led on offense by quarterback Larry Shilling who was selected as the TIAA Offensive Player of the Year in 1980 and returned for the 1981 season. At the end of the 1981 season, Shillings was selected by the American Football Coaches Association as the first-team quarterback on the Kodak College Division II All-America team.

Austin players were selected as first-team players at seven positions on the 1981 All-TIAA football team: quarterback Larry Shillings (tie); wide receiver Clay Oliphant; placekicker and punter Gene Branum; defensive back Chris Luper; linebacker Jeff Robins; and defensive lineman Larry Hickman. Several Austin players also received second-team honors, including running back David Simmons; wide receiver Rory Dukes; offensive guard Don Parnell; offensive tackle David Adams; defensive lineman Rex Baker; linebacker David Bowen; and defensive back Kenny Kirby.

Coach Larry Kramer finished third in voting by the Texas Sports Writers Association for Texas college coach of the year, behind Southwest Texas State coach Jim Wacker and SMU coach Ron Meyer.

Schedule

References

Austin
Austin Kangaroos football seasons
NAIA Football National Champions
Austin Kangaroos football